Yerkovich is a Russian surname. Notable people with the surname include:

Anthony Yerkovich, American producer and television writer
Gloria Yerkovich (born 1942), American activist
Valeri Yerkovich (born 1951), Russian footballer and coach

Russian-language surnames